SaveRite was a U.S. chain of discount grocery stores owned by Winn-Dixie. The store offered a smaller selection and less customer support than most grocery stores.

The chain's marketing was based on its mascot Captain SaveRite, who is shown as a cartoon super-hero resembling Captain America.

Winn-Dixie created the SaveRite brand as an experiment to increase its revenues and opened 11 stores throughout its distribution area.  In November 2001, Winn-Dixie announced plans to convert nearly all of its 40-some Winn-Dixie and Winn-Dixie Marketplace brand stores in the metro Atlanta area into SaveRites as a last-ditch effort to keep a hold on its market share, which was rapidly declining due to stiff competition from Wal-Mart, Publix, Kroger, Ingles, Food Lion, and other similar stores.

However, in 2005, SaveRite pulled out of the Atlanta area due to Winn-Dixie's decision to close 386 stores. Prior to cuts in February 2006, the only known states that had at least one SaveRite were Mississippi, Florida, and Ohio, most notably in the Orlando metro area and in the Meridian, Mississippi area. On February 28, 2006, Winn Dixie announced that it would close about 11 additional SaveRite stores in Central Florida.

On August 18, 2011, Winn Dixie announced it was converting the six remaining SaveRite locations to the Winn-Dixie banner. The conversion from SaveRite to Winn-Dixie was to take about four months, during which time the stores would remain open. All the SaveRite employees were to continue working for Winn-Dixie.

References

Supermarkets of the United States
Companies that filed for Chapter 11 bankruptcy in 2005
Retail companies disestablished in 2011